Benincasa is an Italian surname. Notable people with the surname include:
 Carmine Benincasa (born 1947), Italian art critic and art historian professor
 Caterina Benincasa or Catherine of Siena (1347–1380), tertiary of the Dominican Order and a Scholastic philosopher and theologian
 Pius Anthony Benincasa (1913–1986), bishop of the Catholic Church in the United States
 Sara Benincasa (born 1980), American comedian and author

See also
 Benincasa da Montepulciano (1375–1426), Italian Roman Catholic professed religious from the Servite Order